Andrej Kudrna (born May 11, 1991) is a Slovak professional ice hockey player who is currently playing under contract with HC Verva Litvínov in Czech Extraliga. 

He participated at the 2017 IIHF World Championship and he was also selected and competed in the 2018 Winter Olympics for Slovakia.

Career statistics

Regular season and playoffs

International

References

External links

1991 births
Living people
Slovak ice hockey forwards
People from Nové Zámky
Sportspeople from the Nitra Region
Slovak expatriate ice hockey players in Canada
Slovak expatriate ice hockey players in the Czech Republic
Olympic ice hockey players of Slovakia
Ice hockey players at the 2018 Winter Olympics
HC Slovan Bratislava players
Vancouver Giants players
Red Deer Rebels players
HK 36 Skalica players
HC '05 Banská Bystrica players
HC Sparta Praha players
HC Litvínov players